Rockville is a census-designated place and a village of the town of Vernon in Tolland County, Connecticut, United States. The population was 7,474 at the 2010 census. Incorporated as a city in 1889, it has been consolidated with the town of Vernon since 1965.

Geography

History

Early settlement

This included the area which is now known as "Rockville" and for about the next century it was a nameless village. A prominent feature of the area is the Shenipsit Lake, or "The Snip" as it is currently affectionately called by the residents. The river was used by the farmers for a grist mill, a saw mill, an oil mill and even a distillery starting .

Rock Mill

In 1821, Colonel Francis McLean built the first textile mill in what is now Rockville in partnership with George and Allyn Kellogg and Ralph Talcott, next to a spot known as "the Rock" with capital of $16,000. Francis McLean had partnered previously with some others in the Warburton Mill in Talcottville. "The Rock" was a natural dam of solid stone that made a high falls on the Hockanum River. In what is now the center of Rockville, he dammed up the Hockanum River and built a water-powered mill known as the "Rock Mill", which was possibly also known as the McLean Woolen Factory. By 1823 his mill was in full operation. The new mill was 80 by 30 feet, and its product was blue and blue-mix satinet. In 1826 power looms were introduced.

The mill attracted people to this area and by 1836 the population grew to 440 consisting of 61 families including 89 children under the age of 10.

Name

Mail service was brought once a day by stagecoach from Vernon Center, which was the post office and place for voting for the town. In 1837, according to old records, "an amateurish notice was posted on the Rock Mill announcing a public meeting in the lecture room of the village to decide in a democratic way the most suitable name for the vicinity". In order to have their own post office the town needed a permanent name.

The following were some of the recommendations for naming the town.
Frankfort – in honor of Francis Mclean builder of the "Rock Mill"
Vernon Falls
Grantville – in honor of Samuel Grant the first settler
Hillborough – because the terrain is so hilly
Simon Chapman, who ran a boarding house for mill workers, submitted the name "Rockville" as common expression understood by the surrounding areas was "Going to the Rock". Thus,
Rockvillle became the official name. It was not until 1842, however, that Rockville actually acquired its own post office.

Rockville Historic District
Most of Rockville has been designated as part of the Rockville Historic District. The district is roughly bounded by Shenipsit Street, Davis Avenue, West Street and South Street was added in 1984 to the National Register of Historic Places. The district includes 842 buildings and one other structure. It includes examples of Greek Revival, Late Victorian, and Classical Revival architecture.

The Kellogg House had been used by the State Department of Children and Families to house troubled youth under a contract with Community Solutions, Inc. This arrangement ended on May 2, 2006 after a long history of documented mismanagement by both agencies. The facility is now used for adult transitional housing.

Elm Street, Park Street, and one block of Prospect Street surround a small town park named Talcott Park. The houses represent a variety of Victorian architectural styles ranging from early nineteenth century Greek Revival through the Gothic Revival and Italianate styles down to the Victorian eclecticism of the 1880s and 1890s. The mill owners usually built their houses in the downtown area.

The surviving buildings grouped around Central Park are a continuing reminder of the wealth brought by the woolen industry and the town's aspirations to be a leading city in the state during the 19th century.

On or about November 1, 2007, the light fixtures that sat beside the library steps were stolen. Both fixtures were made of copper shaped into globes. They weighed over one hundred pounds each and were installed as part of the original construction.

Buildings of architectural or historic interest in Rockville include:
St. Bernard Church
Memorial Building housing currently the New England Civil War Museum and the Grand Army of the Republic Hall as well as the town offices for Vernon.
Old Rockville High School and East School
(#10 and #12) Ellington Ave.
Francis T. Maxwell House also known as Maxwell Court
Rockville National Bank
Union Congregational Church
Citizen's Block
Rockville Methodist Episcopal Church
Memorial Building
Fitch Block
George Maxwell Memorial Library
Kellogg House
Turn Halle
Erhardt Linck's Hall
70 Village Street
George Sykes House (first)
Hockanum Mill
Saxony Mill
Springville Mill
Florence Mill
Henry Huhnken's Saloon
New England Yard
Castle Sunset
The Tower on Fox Hill
Baptist Church, since destroyed to make room for a bigger parking lot for Rockville General Hospital.
Maple Street School

Gallery

Demographics
As of the census of 2010, there were 7,474 people, 3,292 households, and 1,681 families residing in the CDP. The racial makeup of the CDP was 76.0% White (70.8% non-Hispanic white), 11.7% African American, 0.4% Native American, 3.3% Asian, 0.1% Pacific Islander, 4.5% from other races, and 4.1% from two or more races. Hispanic or Latino of any race were 12.2% of the population.

There were 3,292 households, out of which 26.8% had children under the age of 18 living with them, 25.6% were married couples living together, 19.6% had a female householder with no husband present, and 48.9% were non-families. 39.2% of all households were made up of individuals, and 14.0% had someone living alone who was 65 years of age or older. The average household size was 2.24 and the average family size was 2.98.

In the CDP, the population was spread out, with 26.5% under the age of 20, 17.8% from 20 to 29, 19.8% from 30 to 44, 23.9% from 45 to 64, and 12.1% who were 65 years of age or older. The median age was 33.7 years. For every 100 females, there were 90.9 males. For every 100 females age 18 and over, there were 87.7 males.

The median income for a household in the CDP was $40,451, and the median income for a family was $40,714. Males working year-round and full-time had a median income of $48,159 versus $37,865 for females. The per capita income for the CDP was $23,079. About 24.5% of families and 22.6% of the population were below the poverty line, including 37.1% of those under age 18 and 16.0% of those age 65 or over.

Notable people

 Jahine Arnold (born 1973), NFL wide receiver
 Stephen Farrell (1863–1933), world champion sprinter and track coach
 Stephanie A. Gallagher (born 1972), United States District Judge
 Alice Belle Garrigus (1858–1949), Evangelist & Founder-Pentecostal Assemblies of Newfoundland & Labrador, Born in Rockville
 William Churchill Hammond (1860-1949), organist and music educator, born in Rockville.
 Edward Stevens Henry (1836–1921), U.S. Congressman
 Morgan Lewis (1906–1968), songwriter and Broadway theatre composer
 Dwight Loomis (1821–1903), U.S. Congressman
 Dwight Marcy (1840–1887), Connecticut State Representative
 Mary Mattingly (born 1979), visual artist
 Ralph Murphy (1895–1967), film director
 Stuart J. Murphy (born 1942), children's book author
 Kenneth North (1930–2010), U.S. Air Force brigadier general
 Bob Pease (1940–2011), analog integrated circuit design expert and technical author
 Charles Phelps (1852–1940), lawyer, state legislator, and Connecticut's first attorney general
 Gene Pitney (1940–2006), internationally known singer/songwriter, member of Rock & Roll Hall of Fame, born in Hartford, raised in Rockville
 Charles Ethan Porter (1847–1923), artist
 Bill Romanowski (1966–present), NFL linebacker, born in Vernon, graduated from Rockville High School in 1984
 Antoni Sadlak (1908–1969), U.S. Congressman

See also

National Register of Historic Places listings in Tolland County, Connecticut

References

External links

 Official Web Page for the town of Vernon
 Community Web Page
 Another Community Web Page
 Vernon Historical Society
 A Walk Through Rockville's Past... The Loom City Revisited – Walking tours through historic Rockville
 Map of Rockville CDP and Rockville Historic District

 
Vernon, Connecticut
Census-designated places in Tolland County, Connecticut
Former municipalities in Connecticut
Villages in Connecticut
Historic districts in Tolland County, Connecticut
Villages in Tolland County, Connecticut
Census-designated places in Connecticut
National Register of Historic Places in Tolland County, Connecticut
Historic districts on the National Register of Historic Places in Connecticut
Populated places disestablished in 1965